The Jonkerbos War Cemetery and Memorial is located in the town of Nijmegen, Netherlands. The cemetery contains 1,643 British Commonwealth and foreign service personnel of World War II. It was built to a design by Commission architect Philip Hepworth.

On Remembrance Day 2022 (May 4) the cemetery was vandalized with swastikas and other paintings such as the Ukrainian flag and references to Azov.

Background
On the site of this cemetery the preparation camp was stationed for the Waal Crossing during Operation Market Garden. Approximately 400 soldiers were first buried at an army complex in the neighborhood and were reburied in 1947 on this site.

There are 1,389 Britons, 88 Canadians, 34 Australians, 21 New Zealanders, 7 Polish, 5 Belgians, 1 Dutch and 1 Russian military buried here.

Images

Nearby Commonwealth War Graves
 Arnhem Oosterbeek War Cemetery
 Groesbeek Canadian War Cemetery
 Mook War Cemetery

References

External links
 
 

1945 establishments in the Netherlands
World War II memorials in the Netherlands
Commonwealth War Graves Commission cemeteries in the Netherlands
Cemeteries in the Netherlands
Cemeteries in Gelderland
Buildings and structures in Nijmegen
History of Nijmegen
20th-century architecture in the Netherlands